Mah Li Lian (born 28 May 1968) is a Singaporean former professional squash player. She is regarded as the finest ever squash player to represent Singapore in international circuit. Mah won the Asian Individual Squash Championships on four successive times in 1988, 1990, 1992 and in 1994. She was the first player to win Asian Squash Women's singles Championships twice and held the record for winning the most number of Asian Individual Squash Championships until 2006 which was broken by Malaysian veteran Nicol David.

Mah competed at her maiden Asian Games event in 1998 and claimed a bronze medal in the women's singles.

References 

Living people
Singaporean female squash players
Squash players at the 1998 Asian Games
Squash players at the 1998 Commonwealth Games
Asian Games bronze medalists for Singapore
Asian Games medalists in squash
Commonwealth Games competitors for Singapore
1968 births
Medalists at the 1998 Asian Games
Victoria Junior College alumni